Securitas AB is a security services (security guarding and mobile patrolling), monitoring, consulting and investigation group, based in Stockholm, Sweden. The group has over 300,000 employees in 53 countries worldwide. Securitas AB is listed at Nasdaq OMX Stockholm, Large Cap segment.

Securitas AB owns and operates the Swiss security company Protectas AG in Switzerland, where there already existed a security company called Securitas AG, part of the Swiss Securitas Group. It is also the parent company of the Pinkerton Detective Agency.

History 

Securitas AB was founded in 1934 in Helsingborg, Sweden, as AB Hälsingborgs Nattvakt, when Erik Philip-Sörensen bought a small guarding company. In 1935, the name was changed to Förenade Svenska Vakt AB. The company expanded through acquisitions of several small security companies, initially in southern Sweden.

In 1949, AB Securitas Alarm was founded as the company's security technology subsidiary, and during the following decade, the company started expanding internationally.

In 1972, the group was rebranded as Securitas, the Roman goddess of security and stability, with a logotype consisting of three red dots and the word "Securitas." The dots are described as representing the group's core values of "Integrity, Vigilance and Helpfulness."

In 1976, Erik Philip-Sörensen sold the Securitas group to his sons Jörgen Philip-Sörensen and Sven Philip-Sörensen, and in 1981, the group was divided between the sons, with the international operations developing into Group 4 and the Swedish operations retaining the Securitas brand.

In 1983, Securitas was sold to the holding company Skrinet, and in 1985, it was acquired by Investment AB Latour, controlled by Gustaf Douglas. Under the new ownership, the group focused on security, and in 1989, an international expansion began, with acquisitions in Norway, Denmark and Portugal, and establishment in Hungary.

In 1991, Securitas was listed at the Stockholm Stock Exchange. In 1994, the group distributed ASSA AB (acquired in 1988) to its shareholders. Throughout the 1990s, foreign acquisitions were made in eleven European countries and in the United States.

In February 1999, Securitas acquired Pinkerton, and in August 2000, Burns Security, and several regional security companies in the United States. These acquisitions made Securitas one of the largest security companies in the world. In 2001, a new organization took effect, with five business areas according to types of services offered, and Loomis Fargo & Company was acquired.

In 2003, the group's security services in the United States were integrated under the Securitas brand, and the group's cash handling services were completely divisionalized, with a joint management for United States and European operations.

In 2006, Marie Ehrling was elected Chairman of Securitas board of directors.

Also in 2006, the divisions Securitas Systems (alarm, monitoring, and access control systems), and Securitas Direct (solutions for homes and small businesses) were distributed to the group's shareholders and listed at the Stockholm Stock Exchange. In the same year, the divisions Mobile (small and medium-sized customers), and Alert Services (electronic surveillance of homes and businesses) were created (as of 2007 constituting the business segment Mobile and Monitoring). Securitas Direct was later renamed to Verisure in all countries except Spain and Portugal.

In November 2007, the United Kingdom cash handling services of the division Loomis were sold to Vaultex Ltd, owned by HSBC and Barclays. Securitas began operating in Peru in November 2007. In 2008, the division Loomis (cash handling) was distributed to the group's shareholders and listed at Nasdaq OMX Stockholm.

In September 2010, Securitas acquired the security-services operations of Reliance Security Group in the United Kingdom. In November 2011, Securitas acquired Chubb Security Personnel in the United Kingdom.

As of 2012, Securitas was present in 53 countries and territories.

In 2013, Securitas acquired Pinkerton Government Services, which provides cleared security services to governmental agencies and programs that require a Department of Defense or Department of Energy security clearance. This government services division of Securitas became known as Securitas Critical Infrastructure Services. This division operates both in the United States and worldwide when cleared services are needed overseas.

In October 2015, Securitas acquired Diebold Incorporated's (NYSE-DBD) Electronic Security business in North America. Diebold's North American Electronic Security business, based in Green, Ohio, United States, is the third largest commercial electronic security provider in North America. Diebold's North American Electronic Security business has approximately 1,100 employees. The operation includes more than 55,000 monitored customer locations and 200,000 sites serviced.

In March 2022, Securitas partnered with Citizen to trial a version of Citizen's on-demand private security service in Chicago.

Operations 

Securitas is divided into three main business segments, "Security Services North America," "Security Services Europe," and "Security Services Ibero-America." Operations outside of the Americas and Europe are reported in a separate category called "Other," which also includes central expenses.

In general, the group operates under the brand Securitas for all business segments. However, sales to consumers are made under the Verisure brand in all countries except Spain and Portugal. Specialized services including due diligence, background checks, security assessments, brand protection, intellectual property protection, executive protection, investigations, cyber surveillance, computer forensics, social compliance and IT security are performed worldwide under the brand "Pinkerton."

These operations are reported as part of the North American business segment. There are three operations centers in North America: Toronto, Ontario, Parsippany, New Jersey and Westlake Village, California. The Swiss market is an exception to the name, in that general security services are provided under the brand Protectas.

See also 

 Loomis for robberies committed against Loomis while it was a division of Securitas
 Securitas depot robbery for the events of 2006 affecting the United Kingdom cash handling operations of the Loomis division of Securitas, at the time operating under the Securitas brand, and in 2007, sold to HSBC and Barclays

References

External links 

 Securitas Epay

Companies based in Stockholm
Security companies of Canada
Security companies of Singapore
Security companies of Sweden
Security companies of the United States
Business services companies established in 1934
Swedish companies established in 1934
Swedish brands
Companies listed on Nasdaq Stockholm
Corporate groups
1991 initial public offerings